The Fennoman movement or Fennomania was a Finnish nationalist movement in the 19th-century Grand Duchy of Finland, built on the work of the fennophile interests of the 18th and early-19th centuries.

History

After the Crimean War, Fennomans founded the Finnish Party and intensified the language strife, yearning to raise the Finnish language and Finnic culture from peasant status to the position of a national language and a national culture. The opposition, the Svecomans, tried to defend the status of Swedish and the ties to the Germanic world.

Although the notion of Fennomans was not as common after the generation of Juho Kusti Paasikivi (born 1870), their ideas have dominated the Finns' understanding of their nation.

The mother tongue of many of the first generation of Fennomans, like Johan Vilhelm Snellman, was Swedish. Some of the originally Swedish-speaking Fennomans learned Finnish, and made a point of using it inside and outside the home.

Several Fennomans were from Finnish or bilingual homes. Some originally had Swedish surnames, common in Finland at that time.

Most of the Fennomans also Finnicized their family names, particularly from the end of the 19th century.

In the last years of the 19th century, and in the first years of the 20th, the Fennoman movement split into two political parties: the Old Finnish Party and the Young Finnish Party.

Motto 
The Fennoman motto attributed to Adolf Ivar Arwidsson was actually coined by Johan Vilhelm Snellman:
"Svenskar äro vi icke, ryssar vilja vi icke bli, låt oss alltså vara finnar."
"We are not Swedes, 
We do not want to be Russians,
So let's be Finns."

Prominent Fennomans
Daniel Juslenius
Fredrik Cygnaeus
Yrjö Sakari Yrjö-Koskinen, formerly Georg Zacharias Forsman
Alexandra Gripenberg
Lauri Kivekäs, formerly Stenbäck
Johannes Linnankoski
Agathon Meurman
Hjalmar Mellin
Julius Krohn
Juho Kusti Paasikivi, formerly Johan Gustav Hellsten
Eemil Nestor Setälä
Johan Vilhelm Snellman
Eero Järnefelt
Otto Donner
Heikki Renvall
Toivo Kuula
Yrjö Jahnsson

See also 
 History of Finland
 Turanism

References

External links
 The Association of Finnish Culture and Identity

Grand Duchy of Finland
Finnish nationalism
Nationalist movements in Europe